Henrik Harlev Petersen (or Henrik Petersen, Henrik Harlev) is a Danish wheelchair curler.

Teams

References

External links 

Living people
Danish male curlers
Danish wheelchair curlers
Year of birth missing (living people)